Fākhitah bint Abī Ṭālib, also known as Hind and better known by her kunya Umm Hānī,  was a cousin and companion of the Islamic prophet Muhammad.

Early life

She was the eldest daughter of Abu Talib ibn Abd al-Muttalib and Fatima bint Asad, hence a sister of Ali.

Marriage
Before 595 the young Muhammad asked Abu Talib's permission to marry Fakhitah, but Abu Talib accepted an alternative proposal from Hubayra ibn Abi Wahb, a member of the wealthy Makhzum clan. Muhammad asked: "Uncle, why have you married her off to Hubayra and ignored me?" Abu Talib replied: "Nephew, they are our in-laws, and the noble is an equal for the noble." This cryptic reply might have meant that Abu Talib owed a favour to the Makhzum clan; but the more likely meaning was that Muhammad had no money.

Hubayra, who was a poet, is described as "wise and influential". He and Fakhitah had at least seven children, 3 daughters and 4 sons: Hani (from whom she took her kunya Umm Hani), Ja'da, Yusuf, Umar, Fulan, Aqla and Amr.

Muhammad was a guest in Fakhitah's house one night in 621. The next morning he told her that he had miraculously travelled to Jerusalem and then to Heaven during the night. She urged him not to tell anyone, as the Quraysh would only laugh at him, and she tried to restrain him physically. Muhammad ignored this advice.

Conversion to Islam
Fakhitah became a Muslim when Muhammad conquered Mecca in January 630. Hubayra did not want to convert, so he fled from Mecca and took refuge in the Christian city of Najran. This caused an automatic divorce. Muhammad proposed to Fakhita again, but she refused him, saying that she would not be able to do justice to both young children and a new husband. Muhammad responded: "The Quraysh are the best women on camel-back! They are so kind to their children and so careful of their husbands' property!"

Later Fakhitah told Muhammad that her children had grown up and she was now ready to marry him. He told her that she was too late, since a new revelation had forbidden him to marry any first cousin who had not emigrated to Medina before the Conquest.

Death
Her date of death is unknown; however, she outlived her brother Ali, who was killed in 661.

References
 

576 births
661 deaths
6th-century Arabs
7th-century Arabs
Women companions of the Prophet